The 1986–87 UNLV Runnin' Rebels basketball team represented the University of Nevada Las Vegas in NCAA Division I men's competition in the 1986–87 season under head coach Jerry Tarkanian. The team played its home games in the Thomas & Mack Center, and was a member of the Pacific Coast Athletic Association (PCAA), now known as the Big West Conference; it would join the Western Athletic Conference in 1996 and become a charter member of its current conference, the Mountain West Conference, in 1999.

The nickname "Runnin' Rebels" is unique to men's basketball at UNLV. The default nickname for men's sports teams at the school is simply "Rebels", while all women's teams are known as "Lady Rebels".

Roster

Schedule and results

|-
!colspan=12 style=| Regular season

|-
!colspan=12 style=| PCAA tournament

|-
!colspan=12 style=| NCAA tournament

Rankings

Awards and honors
Armon Gilliam – PCAA Player of the Year, Consensus Second-team All-American

Team players drafted into the NBA

See also
UNLV Runnin' Rebels basketball
1987 NCAA Division I men's basketball tournament

References

External links
 UNLV Runnin' Rebels Official site 

Unlv
UNLV Runnin' Rebels basketball seasons
NCAA Division I men's basketball tournament Final Four seasons
Unlv
UNLV Runnin' Rebels basketball team
UNLV Runnin' Rebels basketball team